The Republic of Poland Ambassador to Romania is the official representative of the President and the Government of Poland to the President and the Government of Romania.

The ambassador and his staff work in the Polish embassy in Bucharest. Moreover, there are Honorary Consulates located in Brașov, Cluj-Napoca and Timișoara.

The current Poland ambassador to Romania is Maciej Lang, incumbent since July 29, 2018.

History 
Poland have established diplomatic relations with Romania on June 22, 1919. Due to the World War II, in 1940, diplomatic relations between the two countries broke off. In 1945 new communist governments of Poland and Romania officially restored diplomatic relations.

List of ambassadors of Poland to Romania

Second Polish Republic 

 1918-1919: Marian Linde (chargé d’affaires a.i.)
 1919-1922: Aleksander Skrzyński (envoy)
 1922-1923: Paweł Juriewicz (chargé d’affaires a.i.)
 1923: Paweł Juriewicz (envoy)
 1923-1926: Józef Wielowieyski
 1927-1932: Jan Szembek
 1932-1938: Mirosław Arciszewski
 1938-1940: Roger Adam Raczyński

November 4, 1940 – closure of the diplomatic mission at the request of the Germany to the government of the Kingdom of Romania.

Polish People's Republic 

 1946-1947: Stefan Wengierow (chargé d’affaires)
 1947-1951: Piotr Szymański
 1951-1955: Wojciech Wrzosek
 1955-1957: Jan Izydorczyk
 1957-1963: Janusz Zambrowicz
 1963-1968: Wiesław Sobierajski
 1968-1973: Jaromir Ochęduszko
 1973-1979: Władysław Wojtasik
 1979-1981: Jerzy Kusiak
 1981-1988: Bolesław Koperski
 1988-1990: Jerzy Woźniak

Third Polish Republic 
 1990-1992: Zygmunt Komorowski
 1993-1999: Bogumił Luft
 1999-2003: Michał Klinger
 2003-2008: Krystyn Jacek Paliszewski
 2008-2010: Wojciech Zajączkowski
 2011-2015: Marek Szczygieł
 2015-2019: Marcin Wilczek
 since 2020: Maciej Lang

References 

Poland
Romania